In England and Scotland, a toft village is a settlement comprising small and relatively closely packed farms (tofts) with the surrounding land owned and farmed by those who live in the village's buildings. Late Old English toft, with Old English declension (plural) toftas > tofts. Toft as a placename element is usually dated to the Viking Age by place-name historians.

Placenames ending in -toft are usually of Old Norse derivation, topt meaning "site of a house". Examples are Langtoft, Habertoft, Huttoft, Knaptoft, Lowestoft, Newtoft, Scraptoft, Sibbertoft, Stowlangtoft, Wibtoft, Yelvertoft and various places simply called Toft in the former Danelaw. This typical Old Norse element allows estimation of the extension of Scandinavian settlements in the Middle Ages such as in Schleswig-Holstein (-toft : Langstoft, Havetoft, Koltoft, Goltoft, Kaltoft...), Normandy (-tot : Lanquetot, Colletot, Caltot, Hottot, Hotot...), etc.

References

Rural geography
Human habitats